Cryptocoryne × willisii is a plant in the family Araceae.

Synonyms
Cryptocoryne nevillii (a valid but different species); C. lucens is now considered a hybrid in the C. × willisii complex

Taxonomy
In 1976 Niels Jacobsen proposed the change of name of C. nevillii to C. × willisii. This plant is a natural hybrid, so the name is spelt with a cross: C. × willisii.
 Crypts page C. nevillii

Distribution
Sri Lanka (Kandy area)

Description
The leaves and even the spathe of this plant are variable (no doubt due to its hybrid nature). The crypts page (see link below) illustrate a number of different forms which makes identification difficult. Cryptocoryne x willisi is a smaller member of the genus along with cryptocoryne parva, and may only reach up to 5cm in size.

Cultivation
Not difficult to grow and common in aquariums but some forms do not seem to flower.

References
 Alston, A.H.G., 1938. Cryptocoryne in: The Kandy Flora : 68, fig.363-367 (with some drawings).
 Jacobsen, N., 1987. Cryptocoryne in: A Revised Handbook to the Flora of Ceylon, Vol. VI: 85-99
 Wit, H.C.D.de, 1969. Cryptocoryne nevillii Trim. ex Hook.f.. Het Aquarium 39(11) : 242-245.

External links
 Crypts pages C. undulata
 Tropica
 AquaHobby

willisii
Aquatic plants
Hybrid plants